Dame Alida Luisa Brittain  (née Harvey; 12 June 1883 – 5 January 1943) was a British harpist. She was the wife of politician and journalist Sir Harry Brittain.

The only daughter of businessman Sir Robert Harvey and Franco-Peruvian Alida María Godefroy, Alida was born in Iquique (then in Peru), where her father made millions as a saltpetre producer. Her maternal grandfather was Émile Godefroy of Pessac, Bordeaux. In 1885, the family returned to Cornwall, where her father purchased the Trenoweth estate and several properties in nearby Devon. She had five younger brothers, including politician Sir Samuel Emile Harvey.

A noted harpist and composer, she was elected a Bard of the Cornish Gorseth. In 1927, she was honorary musical director of the National Conservative Musical Union. She served as president of the Society of Women Journalists from 1929–32, and was a Member of the Celtic Congress in 1933.

She was created a Dame Commander of the Order of the British Empire in the 1929 New Year Honours, for political and public services.

She married Harry Brittain in 1905. They had two children: Robert Edmund Godefroy Brittain and Alida Gwendolen Rosemary Brittain.

She died suddenly at home in Headley, Hampshire, in 1943.

Legacy
Alida, Saskatchewan is named in her honour.

References

1883 births
1943 deaths
English harpists
English people of Cornish descent
English people of French descent
English people of Peruvian descent
Bards of Gorsedh Kernow
Dames Commander of the Order of the British Empire
People from Iquique
British people of Cornish descent
British people of French descent
British people of Peruvian descent
Women harpists
20th-century English women musicians